Player's Secrets of Baruk-Azhik is an accessory for the 2nd edition of the Advanced Dungeons & Dragons fantasy role-playing game, published in 1996.

Contents
Player's Secrets of Baruk-Azhik is a supplement for the Birthright campaign setting, which focuses on the dwarven domain of Baruk-Azhik, found within the Iron Peaks. The player character is a newly appointed Overthane, and privy to riches in the form of minerals, gemstones, and Moraskorr ore. Lying within the shadow of the Gorgon presents a constant threat to the dwarven race, as does the awnshegh known as the Chimaera settled in the Promontory province of the domain, and the rumor of another creature trapped within a north-western province. Also, the expanding orog hordes under the dwarven settlements provide a prominent danger, an army the dwarves cannot defeat. The book presents a comprehensive depiction of the dwarven race and its struggle to survive, and details every aspect of dwarven life, from a brief history of the race to their culture and guilds.

Publication history
Player's Secrets of Baruk-Azhik was published by TSR, Inc. in 1996.

Reception
David Comford reviewed Player's Secrets of Baruk-Azhik for Arcane magazine, rating it a 9 out of 10 overall. He called Baruk-Azhik "a great volume", observing that unlike the "other Secrets volumes, the adventure hooks provided are original and exciting. As an alien race, the dwarves are not fully understood by the humans that border their lands, and the plots described play on this. In common with the other volumes, though, the layout, artwork and general presentation is excellent." Comford concludes his review by stating that for the price, "this is an essential guide to not only the dwarven realm, but also the dwarven people".

References

Birthright (campaign setting) supplements
Role-playing game supplements introduced in 1996